Francis Edward "Joe" Chamberlain (13 May 1900 – 20 October 1984) was an influential Australian Labor Party State Secretary in Western Australia who became a Federal Party president and secretary.

References

1900 births
1984 deaths
20th-century Australian politicians